Events in the year 1983 in Bulgaria.

Incumbents 

 General Secretaries of the Bulgarian Communist Party: Todor Zhivkov
 Chairmen of the Council of Ministers: Grisha Filipov

Events 

 The 1982 Bulgarian Cup Final was the 42nd final of the Bulgarian Cup (in this period the tournament was named Cup of the Soviet Army), and was contested between Lokomotiv Sofia and Lokomotiv Plovdiv on 12 June 1982 at Slavi Aleksiev Stadium in Pleven. Lokomotiv Sofia won the final 2–1 after extra time.

References 

 
1980s in Bulgaria
Years of the 20th century in Bulgaria
Bulgaria
Bulgaria